Narcisista Por Excelencia (English: Quintessential Narcissist) is a song by Mexican rock band Panda. It was released as the lead single for the band's fourth album, Amantes Sunt Amentes in 2006. The song reached the MTV TRL in Latin America, where it peaked at number one .

Like most of the tracks on the album, it portrays love in a ridiculous way that describes a boy who feels insecure about his appearance and how his appearance is perceived by a girl he has a crush on.

Charts

References

Rock en Español songs
2006 singles
Panda (band) songs
Mexican rock songs
Songs written by José Madero